Mitochondrial 70kDa heat shock protein (mtHsp70), also known as mortalin, is a protein that in humans is encoded by the HSPA9 gene.

Function 

The product encoded by this gene belongs to the heat shock protein 70 family which contains both heat-inducible and constitutively expressed members. The latter are called heat-shock cognate proteins. This gene encodes a heat-shock cognate protein. This protein plays a role in the control of cell proliferation. It may also act as a chaperone.

Interactions 

HSPA9 has been shown to interact with FGF1 and P53.

Clinical relevance and genetic deficiency 

In 2015, a group around Andrea Superti-Furga showed that biallelic variants in the HSPA9 gene may result in a combination of congenital malformations called the EVEN-PLUS syndrome. These genetic variants have been shown to interfere with normal HSPA9 function

References

Further reading

External links 
 
 PDBe-KB provides an overview of all the structure information available in the PDB for Human Stress-70 protein, mitochondrial

Heat shock proteins
Molecular chaperones
Mitochondrial proteins